Mitchell's Christian Singers were an American gospel music group who recorded prolifically between 1934 and 1940.

Musical career
Formed in the early 1930s in Kinston, North Carolina, the group initially featured William Brown (lead tenor), Julius Davis (tenor), Louis "Panella" David (baritone) and Lewis Herring (bass), all former farmers.  Later, two of them drove trucks, one was a carpenter and one a tobacco-factory hand. Good friends, they gradually drifted into the habit of singing together in the evenings after work.

They were discovered by J. B. Long, a talent scout for the American Record Company who was also responsible for discovering Blind Boy Fuller.  Originally known as the "New Four Quartet,"  they were managed by former singer Willie Mitchell and first recorded in August 1934 as "Mitchell's New Four Singers" under the supervision of producer William Calloway.  In 1935, Herring left and was replaced by Sam Bryant. When they recorded again in 1936, they did so under the name of "Mitchell's Christian Singers".  They recorded over 80 songs over six years, released on seven different labels owned by the American Record Company.  They became more widely known after performing at the From Spirituals to Swing concert presented by John Hammond in Carnegie Hall on 23 December 1938.  Their last recordings were in 1940, after which they occasionally performed at community functions in Kinston.

They pioneered a 'primitive' idiosyncratic style of a cappella gospel singing: curiously wailing, syncopated spirituals, with a "down home" quality, featuring with an interplay of voices that anticipated the sound of post-war gospel quartets. Their material was mostly standard quartet fare like "What Are They Are Doing in Heaven?", "Traveling Shoes", "Swing Low Sweet Chariot", etc.

Discography

References

 Time Magazine, Monday Jan 2 1939
 Sleeve notes

American gospel musical groups
Musical groups from North Carolina
Musical groups established in 1934
1934 establishments in North Carolina